Berrilee is a semi-rural outer suburb of Sydney, in the state of New South Wales, Australia. Berrilee is located 38 kilometres north of the Sydney central business district, in the local government area of Hornsby Shire and is part of the Hills District region.

Berrilee sits on the western shore of Berowra Creek, which empties into the Hawkesbury River.

History
Berrilee is believed to be derived from an Aboriginal word 'Buraillee' possibly having something to do with mouth or food.

Demographics
According to the 2016 census, there were 224 people in Berrilee. 81.6% of people were born in Australia and 87.2% of people only spoke English at home.

Local area
Berrilee is a small town, without any "stores", to speak. There is one small store near Berowra Waters and another in Arcadia. There was a primary school, but due to a lack of students (there were less than seven), it closed down in 1957. It re-opened shortly after but closed down and the property was sold in 2005.

References

External links
  [CC-By-SA]

Suburbs of Sydney
Hawkesbury River
Hornsby Shire